Naja Tarek Mohamed (born 15 March 1996) is an Egyptian badminton player. She won the women's doubles title at the 2013 Morocco International partnered with Doha Hany.

Achievements

BWF International Challenge/Series 
Women's doubles

Mixed doubles

  BWF International Challenge tournament
  BWF International Series tournament
  BWF Future Series tournament

References

External links 
 

Living people
1996 births
Egyptian female badminton players
21st-century Egyptian women